The Granby roll is a wrestling reversal named for Granby High School in Norfolk, Virginia, where it was popularized by coach Billy Martin SR.

A Granby roll is performed from an inferior position, usually when the top wrestler has a hold upon the lower wrestler's waist from the side or when moving to "take the back." The bottom wrestler rises slightly and cross steps under his own body, using it to post as they kick high with the other leg and perform a shoulder roll to the inside shoulder, either achieving an escape or a reversal with possible back points on the other wrestler.

Billy Martin Sr was voted the all-time greatest high school wrestling coach by the National Coaches Association and was selected as the second most influential wrestling coach in the sport by Amateur Wrestling News Magazine. 

Source: Michael Martin, Billy Martin Sr.’s grandson and former Four Time AAA Virginia State wrestling champion.

Wrestling